Jane Elizabeth Leeves (born 18 April 1961) is an English actress, best known for her role as Daphne Moon on the NBC sitcom Frasier (1993-2004), for which she was nominated for an Emmy Award and a Golden Globe Award. She also played Joy Scroggs on TV Land's sitcom Hot in Cleveland.

Leeves made her screen debut with a small role in 1983 on the British comedy television show The Benny Hill Show, and appeared as a dancer in Monty Python's The Meaning of Life. She moved to the United States, where she performed in small roles. From 1986 to 1988, she had her first leading role in the short-lived sitcom Throb, then secured a recurring part in the television sitcom Murphy Brown.  She received further recognition for roles in films such as Miracle on 34th Street (1994), James and the Giant Peach (1996), Music of the Heart (1999), and The Event (2003). In 2018, she began starring in the Fox medical drama The Resident.

Career 

The daughter of an engineer and a nurse, Jane Leeves was born in Ilford, Essex, England. She was raised in East Grinstead, Sussex, along with two sisters and a brother.
She was a regular on The Benny Hill Show (as one of "Hill's Angels"). She made use of her experience as a dancer in a scene in Monty Python's The Meaning of Life. In the US, she appeared as a tourist with a baby in the video for David Lee Roth's song "California Girls", but struggled for several years to establish an acting career. She became somewhat visible as the flighty record company employee Blue (née Prudence Anne Bartlett) on the syndicated sitcom Throb.

She had a recurring role in the television series Murphy Brown as Audrey, the smart but awkward girlfriend of producer Miles Silverberg (played by Grant Shaud). She also appeared as the troublesome Marla the Virgin in four episodes of Seinfeld: "The Virgin", "The Contest", "The Pilot", and "The Finale – Part 2". During this period, Leeves was cast as Holly for the pilot of the US version of the science-fiction comedy Red Dwarf. She also had a role as a lesbian avant-garde dancer, the girlfriend of the girlfriend of Willem Dafoe's character, in the 1985 film To Live and Die in L.A..

In 1993, Leeves joined the cast of the television series Frasier as the eccentric, forthright and psychic Mancunian Daphne Moon. By the start of the eighth season, Leeves was pregnant, and the writers incorporated her pregnancy into shows as weight gain due to her character's stress from her relationship with Niles (portrayed by David Hyde Pierce). By the conclusion of Frasier, Leeves had been nominated for a Primetime Emmy Award for Outstanding Supporting Actress in a Comedy Series nomination (1998), and a Golden Globe Award for Best Supporting Actress – Series, Miniseries or Television Film (1995).

Appearing less frequently in cinema, Leeves lent her speaking and singing voice to the animated film James and the Giant Peach (1996) as Mrs. Ladybug, and appeared in Music of the Heart (1999). In 2002, she appeared in the Broadway musical Cabaret. In 2004, she hosted an episode of the television comedy quiz show Have I Got News for You. Her 2006 show, The WB's sitcom Misconceptions, went unaired.

Leeves provided guest vocals in The Penguins of Madagascar as Lulu, a female chimp, with whom Phil fell in love. With Peri Gilpin, Leeves also set up the production company Bristol Cities (cockney rhyming slang for 'titties'). Their last project was in 2007, a pilot for a US remake of the British sitcom The Vicar of Dibley, with Kirstie Alley in the title role. In 2010, Leeves guest starred in two episodes in ABC's Desperate Housewives as Lynette and Tom's therapist, Dr. Graham.

From 2010 until 2015, Leeves played the 40-something ex 'eyebrow artist to the stars' Joy Scroggs in the TV Land comedy, Hot in Cleveland, with Valerie Bertinelli, Wendie Malick (also her co-star in the final season of Frasier), and Betty White. In 2011, she was nominated Screen Actors Guild Award for Outstanding Performance by an Ensemble in a Comedy Series along with the rest of the cast. The series ended in 2015 after six seasons and 128 episodes. She returned to television in 2018, with her first series regular role in a dramatic series, the Fox medical drama The Resident playing orthopaedic surgeon Kit Voss.

Personal life 
Leeves is married to Marshall Coben, a CBS Paramount Television executive. Peri Gilpin, Leeve's co-star on Frasier, is her neighbor and close friend and was in the delivery room when Leeves's first child was born. In the season 8 episode 17 of Frasier, "It Takes Two to Tangle", Niles tells Roz that Leeves' character Daphne has lost 9lb 12 oz at the health spa: a nod to the actual weight of Leeves' baby girl.

Filmography

Film

Television

Awards and nominations

References

External links 

 
 
 
 

1961 births
20th-century English actresses
21st-century English actresses
Actresses from Essex
English expatriates in the United States
English film actresses
English stage actresses
English television actresses
English LGBT rights activists
Living people
People from Ilford
People from East Grinstead